Manppally is a small village located near Thazhava, Kollam district, Kerala, India.

Politics

Manappally is a part of Karunagappally assembly constituency in Alappuzha (Lok Sabha constituency). Shri. CR Mahesh  is the current MLA of Karunagappally. Shri.K. C. Venugopal is the current member of parliament of Alappuzha.

Religion

St Mary's Salem Orthodox Church, located here is a part of Kollam Diocese of Malankara Orthodox Syrian Church and is dedicated to Saint Mary. It is also Known as 'Thekkinte Manarkadu', all religions co-exist here, especially Islam, Hinduism, and to a smaller extent Christianity.

References

Villages in Kollam district